Lysye Gory is an urban locality (an urban-type settlement) in Lysogorsky District of Saratov Oblast, Russia. Population:

References

Urban-type settlements in Saratov Oblast
Atkarsky Uyezd